Lumo is a 2007 documentary film about twenty-year-old Lumo Sinai, a woman who fell victim to "Africa's First World War." While returning home one day, Lumo and another woman were gang-raped by a group of soldiers fighting for control of the Democratic Republic of the Congo during the 1994 Rwandan genocide. As a result, Lumo suffered from a traumatic fistula, a chronic condition that leaves her unable to bear children. Rejected by her fiancé and most of the village, Lumo examines a woman's tragedy and the process of healing.

Lumo was directed and produced by Bent-Jorgen Perlmutt, Nelson Walker III, Louis Abelman and Lynn True and was aired as part of PBS's Point of View series in 2007.

References

External links
 

Documentary films about the Rwandan genocide
Documentary films about violence against women
POV (TV series) films
Violence against women in the Democratic Republic of the Congo
Gang rape in Africa
Documentary films about women in Africa
Documentary films about women in war